The Athletics competitions in the 1977 Bolivarian Games were held at Estadio Hernando Siles in La Paz, Bolivia, on October 15–29, 1977.

A detailed history of the early Bolivarian Games, 1938 to 1989, was written (in Spanish) by José Gamarra Zorrilla, former President of the Bolivian Olympic Committee, and first President (1976-1982) of ODESUR. Gold medal winners from Ecuador were published by the Comité Olímpico Ecuatoriano.

In 1977, total of 37 events were contested: 23 by men and 14 by women.

Medal summary

Starting January 1, 1977, the International Association of Athletics Federations required fully automatic timing to the hundredth of a second for events up to 400 metres. Some results in the middle and long distance events that did not have fully automatic timing are marked (a).

Men

Women

Medal table (unofficial)

References

Athletics at the Bolivarian Games
International athletics competitions hosted by Bolivia
Bolivarian Games
1977 in Bolivian sport